The 1981 San Marino motorcycle Grand Prix was the tenth race of the 1981 Grand Prix motorcycle racing season. It took place on the weekend of 10-12 July 1981 at the Autodromo Dino Ferrari.

Classification

500 cc

References

San Marino and Rimini Riviera motorcycle Grand Prix
San Marino
San Marino Motorcycle Grand Prix
San Marino Motorcycle Grand Prix